Hovhannes Bachkov (born 2 December 1992) is an Armenian amateur boxer. He competed in the light-welterweight division at the 2016 Summer Olympics, but was eliminated in the second bout. He won the bronze medal at the 2020 Summer Olympics in Tokyo.

References

External links

 

1992 births
Living people
Armenian male boxers
Olympic boxers of Armenia
Boxers at the 2016 Summer Olympics
Sportspeople from Gyumri
AIBA World Boxing Championships medalists
Boxers at the 2015 European Games
Boxers at the 2019 European Games
European Games medalists in boxing
European Games gold medalists for Armenia
Lightweight boxers
Boxers at the 2020 Summer Olympics
Medalists at the 2020 Summer Olympics
Olympic bronze medalists for Armenia
Olympic medalists in boxing
21st-century Armenian people